The 1991 Junior Pot Black was the fourth staging of the junior snooker tournament and the first since 1983 which was held in the Trentham Gardens at Stoke-on-Trent and was played alongside the senior competition which also got revived this year. 8 young players were competing in a knockout format. The matches are one-frame shoot-outs, a two frame aggregate score in the semi-final and best of three frames in the final.

Broadcast during school holiday mornings on BBC1 on the first week and BBC2 during the second, the series started at 11:05 on Tuesday 20 August 1991. Eammon Holmes presented the programme with Ted Lowe and John Spencer as commentators and John Williams as referee.

Future professional players in this revived series include Ronnie O'Sullivan, Matthew Stevens and Lee Walker. O'Sullivan won the series beating Ireland's Declan Murphy 2–0 with a 92 break in the first frame.

Main draw

References

Pot Black
Snooker competitions in England
1991 in snooker
1991 in English sport